Yeongkwang Industry Co, Ltd. is a Korean automotive, chemical, and engineering companies any. Its products include traffic signs, auto parts, acryl lamps and light cover products.

Based in Company divisions
Automotive:Buk-Ri Nongong-Eup Dalseong, Daegu, established in 1998, the CEO is Lee Jang Ho (이장호).
Traffic Sign & Engineering:Sangok-Ri Gochon-Myeon Gimpo, Gyeonggi-do
Chemical:Donghyang-Ri Yangseong-Myeon Anseong, Gyeonggi-do, established in 1991.

Department products

Automotive (Dalseong, Daegu)
Pulley & Bearing Assembly
Clutch & Coil Housing Assembly
Hub & Clutch Assembly
Swash Plate & Shaft Assembly / Piston
Control Valve
Piston Shoe

Traffic Sign & Engineering (Gimpo, Gyeonggi-do)
Stainless Road Brighter
Aluminium Sign Plate  
Traffic Safety Sign Plate  
Information Sign plate
Turning Direct Sign Plate
Road Assistant Products  
Lining Light
Work Information Sign
Fire Dept Continuous Sign
Fire Dept Equipment Box
Working Sign
Safety Policy Sign
Electric Continuous Sign
Total Information Plate
Parking Continuous Sign
Flex Sign
Image Sign
Construction Yard Sign
Non-Crash Record Plate
Floor Sign
Safety Confidence Sign
Safety Jacket
PE Fence
PE Drum

Chemical (Anseong, Gyeonggi-do)
Acryl Lamp & Light Cover

Global corporate
Kuala Lumpur (Automotive division)

See also
Economy of South Korea
Automotive
Chemical
Engineering

External links
Yeongkwang Industry Automotive Homepage 
Yeongkwang Industry Traffic Sign homepage 
Yeongkwang Industry Engineering Homepage 
Yeongkwang industry Chemical Homepage 

Chemical companies of South Korea
Engineering companies of South Korea
Chemical companies established in 1991
Manufacturing companies established in 1991
South Korean companies established in 1991
Auto parts suppliers of South Korea
South Korean brands